The Canadian Art Song Project is a group that commissions the composition of Canadian vocal music. The group is based in Toronto and was founded by Lawrence Wiliford and Steven Philcox.

References

External links
Canadian Art Song Project

Canadian classical music groups
Organizations based in Toronto
Musical groups from Toronto
Musical groups with year of establishment missing